8/2 may refer to:

August 2 (month-day date notation)
February 8 (day-month date notation)
 The fraction otherwise known as 4